Luke 24 is the twenty-fourth and final chapter of the Gospel of Luke in the New Testament of the Christian Bible. The book containing this chapter is anonymous, but early Christian tradition uniformly affirmed that Luke the Evangelist composed this Gospel as well as the Acts of the Apostles. This chapter records the discovery of the resurrection of Jesus Christ, his appearances to his disciples and his ascension into heaven.

Text
The original text was written in Koine Greek. This chapter is divided into 53 verses.

Textual witnesses
Some early manuscripts containing the text of this chapter are:
Papyrus 75 (AD 175-225)
Codex Vaticanus (325-350)
Codex Sinaiticus (330-360)
Codex Bezae (~400)
Codex Washingtonianus (~400)
Codex Alexandrinus (400-440)
Codex Ephraemi Rescriptus (~450; extant verses 1-6, 46-53)

Resurrection morning (24:1–12)

Verse 1

F. W. Farrar, in the Cambridge Bible for Schools and Colleges, suggests that the words "certain other women" are "probably spurious", not being part of the text in the Codex Sinaiticus, Codex Vaticanus, Codex Ephraemi Rescriptus or Codex Regius manuscripts.

Verse 10

"The women who had come with him from Galilee" included "Mary Magdalene, Joanna, Mary the mother of James, and the other women with them". 

The names of some women are mentioned in the canonical gospels, but only Luke's gospel mentions Joanna, implying that Luke receives his special information from "one (most likely Joanna) or more than one of" the women. In Luke 8:1–3 Mary called Magdalene, Joanna the wife of Chuza, and Susanna are named as women who provided material sustenance to Jesus during his travels, along with other unnamed women.

While Matthew, Mark and John mentioned the names of the women present at the cross, Luke only refers them as "the women that followed him from Galilee", but name the women at the end in the story of the women's visit to the empty tomb (Luke 24:10). The two passages with the names of some women alongside the mention of the "twelve" and "apostles", respectively (Luke 8:1–3 and Luke 24:10), "form a literary inclusio" which brackets the major part of Jesus' ministry (leaving out only the earliest part of it).

Verse 12
But Peter arose and ran to the tomb; and stooping down, he saw the linen cloths lying by themselves; and he departed, marveling to himself at what had happened.
This verse and verse 34, "The Lord is risen indeed, and has appeared to Simon!", suggest that Peter (alone) went to the tomb, whereas verse 24, And certain of those who were with us went to the tomb and found it just as the women had said, implies more than one person.

American biblical scholar Kim Dreisbach states that  (othonia), translated here as "linen cloths", is "a word of uncertain meaning ... probably best translated as a generic plural for grave clothes".

Road to Emmaus (24:13–35)

 describes Jesus' appearance to two disciples who are walking from Jerusalem to Emmaus, which is said to be 60 stadia (10.4 to 12 km, depending on the definition of stadion is used) from Jerusalem. One of the disciples is named Cleopas (verse 18), while his companion remains unnamed.

Road to Emmaus (24:36–49)

Verse 36
Now as they said these things, Jesus Himself stood in the midst of them, and said to them, "Peace to you."
This account agrees with John 20:19, which notes the fact that 'the doors of the room had been closed for fear of the Jews'.

Verse 37
They were fearful and terrified and thought they were seeing a ghost.

Ascension of Jesus (24:50–53)

Verse 51
Now it came to pass, while He blessed them, that He was parted from them and carried up into heaven.
The words "and carried up into heaven" are not included in some ancient texts of the gospel.

Verse 53
 
and were continually in the temple praising and blessing God. Amen. 
Luke's gospel ends where it began, in the temple.

The King James Version ends with the word "Amen", following the Textus Receptus, but modern critical editions of the New Testament exclude this word, as do many modern English translations. In a manuscript copy of Beza's, there are added words:
The Gospel according to Saint Luke was published fifteen years after the ascension of Christ,
a tradition also known to the eleventh-century Byzantine bishop Theophylact of Ohrid.

See also
 Ascension of Jesus
 Emmaus
 Holy Week
 Jerusalem
 Ministry of Jesus
 Overview of resurrection appearances in the Gospels and Paul
 Relics associated with Jesus
 Shroud of Turin
 Sudarium of Oviedo
 Related Bible parts: Matthew 28, Mark 16, Luke 8, Luke 23, John 20, Acts 1, Acts 2, 1 Corinthians 15

Notes

References

Bibliography

External links 
 King James Bible - Wikisource
English Translation with Parallel Latin Vulgate 
Online Bible at GospelHall.org (ESV, KJV, Darby, American Standard Version, Bible in Basic English)
Multiple bible versions at Bible Gateway (NKJV, NIV, NRSV etc.)

Gospel of Luke chapters
Empty tomb
Post-resurrection appearances of Jesus
Ascension of Jesus